Marvel Premiere is an American comic book anthology series that was published by Marvel Comics. In concept it was a tryout book, intended to determine if a character or concept could attract enough readers to justify launching their own series, though in its later years it was also often used as a dumping ground for stories which could not be published elsewhere. It ran for 61 issues from April 1972 to August 1981. Contrary to the title, the majority of the characters and concepts featured in Marvel Premiere had previously appeared in other comics.

Publication history
Marvel Premiere was one of three tryout books proposed by Stan Lee after he transitioned from being Marvel Comics' writer and editor to its president and publisher, the others being Marvel Spotlight and Marvel Feature. The advantage of such tryout books was that they allowed the publisher to assess a feature's popularity without the marketing investment required to launch a new series, and without the blow to the publisher's image with readers if the new series immediately failed.

In addition to giving established characters a first shot at a starring role, Marvel Premiere introduced new characters and reintroduced characters who no longer had their own titles. Writer Roy Thomas and penciler Gil Kane revamped Him as the allegorical Messiah Adam Warlock in Marvel Premiere #1 (April 1972). Doctor Strange took over the series with issue #3 and writer Steve Englehart and artist Frank Brunner began a run on the character with issue #9. The two killed Dr. Strange's mentor, the Ancient One, and Strange became the new Sorcerer Supreme. Englehart and Brunner created a multi-issue storyline in which a sorcerer named Sise-Neg ("Genesis" spelled backward) goes back through history, collecting all magical energies, until he reaches the beginning of the universe, becomes all-powerful and creates it anew, leaving Strange to wonder whether this was, paradoxically, the original creation. Stan Lee, seeing the issue after publication, ordered Englehart and Brunner to print a retraction saying this was not God but "a" god, so as to avoid offending religious readers. The writer and artist concocted a letter from a fictitious minister praising the story, and mailed it to Marvel from Texas; Marvel unwittingly printed the letter, and dropped the retraction order. In 2010, Comics Bulletin ranked Englehart and Brunner's run on the "Doctor Strange" feature ninth on its list of the "Top 10 1970s Marvels".

Iron Fist first appeared in issue #15, written by Roy Thomas and drawn by Gil Kane. Other introductions include the Legion of Monsters, the Liberty Legion, Woodgod, the 3-D Man, and the second Ant-Man (Scott Lang). The series also featured the first comic book appearance of rock musician Alice Cooper.

Though Adam Warlock, Doctor Strange, and Iron Fist were all given their own series following their tryout in Marvel Premiere, many of the later features were never meant even as potential candidates for a series. In some cases, such as the Wonder Man story in issue #55 and the Star-Lord story in #61, the writer simply wanted to do a story featuring that character and there was not a more appropriate place for it to be published. Some features, such as Seeker 3000 (issue #41), were conceived specifically for Marvel Premiere but with no real plan for a series. Later in the title's run, Marvel Premiere was used to finish stories of characters who had lost their own series including the Man-Wolf in issues #45–46 and the Black Panther in issues #51–53.

Issues 
 #1–2 - Adam Warlock (moved to his own series)
 #3–14 - Doctor Strange (moved to his own second series)
 #15–25 - Iron Fist (moved to his own series)
 #26 - Hercules
 #27 - Satana
 #28 - Legion of Monsters
 #29–30 - Liberty Legion
 #31 - Woodgod
 #32 - Monark Starstalker
 #33–34 - Solomon Kane
 #35–37 - 3-D Man
 #38 - Weirdworld
 #39–40 - Torpedo
 #41 - Seeker 3000
 #42 - Tigra
 #43 - Paladin
 #44 - Jack of Hearts
 #45–46 - Man-Wolf
 #47–48 - Ant-Man (Scott Lang)
 #49 - The Falcon
 #50 - Alice Cooper
 #51–53 - Black Panther
 #54 - Caleb Hammer
 #55 - Wonder Man
 #56 - Dominic Fortune
 #57–60 - Doctor Who (reprints from Marvel UK's Doctor Who Weekly)
 #61 - Star-Lord

Collected editions
 Marvel Masterworks Warlock Vol. 1 includes Marvel Premiere #1–2, 288 pages, February 2007,  
 Essential Warlock Vol 1 includes Marvel Premiere #1–2, 576 pages, August 2012, 
 Essential Doctor Strange Vol. 2 includes Marvel Premiere #3–10 and #12–14, (#11 was reprints.) 608 pages, December 2007,  
 Marvel Masterworks Doctor Strange Vol. 4 includes Marvel Premiere #3–8, 272 pages, January 2010, 
 Marvel Masterworks Doctor Strange Vol. 5 includes Marvel Premiere #9–14, 288 pages, April 2011, 
 Doctor Strange Epic Collection Vol. 3: A Separate Reality includes Marvel Premiere #3–14, 472 pages, October 2016, 
 Essential Iron Fist Vol. 1 includes Marvel Premiere #15–25, 584 pages, October 2004,  
 Marvel Masterworks Iron Fist Vol. 1 includes Marvel Premiere #15–25, 256 pages, June 2011, 
 Iron Fist Epic Collection Vol. 1: The Fury of Iron Fist includes Marvel Premiere #15–25, 528 pages, July 2015,  and September 2018, 
 Marvel Universe by John Byrne Omnibus Vol. 2 includes Marvel Premiere #25, 1296 pages, December 2018, 
 Essential Marvel Horror Vol 1 includes Marvel Premiere #27, 648 pages, October 2006,  
 Essential Werewolf by Night Vol. 2 includes Marvel Premiere #28, 576 pages, November 2007,  
 Werewolf by Night Omnibus includes Marvel Premiere #28, 1176 pages, October 2016, 
 Werewolf by Night: The Complete Collection Vol. 3 includes Marvel Premiere #28 and material from Marvel Premiere #59, 464 pages, May 2018, 
 Mobius the Living Vampire Omnibus includes Marvel Premiere #28, 864 pages, May 2020, 
 Invaders Classic: The Complete Collection Vol. 1 includes Marvel Premiere #29–30, 248 pages, July 2007, 
 The Thing: Liberty Legion includes Marvel Premier #29–30, 650 pages, July 2011, 
 The Chronicles of Solomon Kane includes Marvel Premiere #33–34, 200 pages, December 2009, 
 Weirdworld includes Marvel Premiere #38, 312 pages, April 2015, 
 Marvel Masterworks Daredevil Vol. 13 includes Marvel Premiere #39–40, 312 pages, March 2019, 
 Women of Marvel Omnibus includes Marvel Premiere #42, 1160 pages, January 2011, 
 Tigra: The Complete Collection includes Marvel Premiere #42, 424 pages, December 2019, 
 Marvel Masterworks Daredevil Vol. 14 includes Marvel Premiere #43, 320 pages, January 2020, 
 Marvel Masterworks Iron Man Vol. 13 includes Marvel Premiere #44, 360 pages, March 2021, 
 Man-Wolf: The Complete Collection includes Marvel Premiere #45–46, 408 pages, October 2019, 
 Marvel Universe by John Byrne Omnibus Vol. 1 includes Marvel Premiere #47–48, 1120 pages, April 2016, 
 Marvel Masterworks Ant-Man/Giant-Man Vol. 3 includes Marvel Premiere #47–48, 376 pages, June 2018,  
 Marvel Masterworks The Avengers Vol. 18 includes Marvel Premiere #49, 320 pages, April 2018, 
 Marvel Masterworks Black Panther Vol. 2 includes Marvel Premiere #51–53, 352 pages, October 2016, 
 Black Panther Epic Collection Vol. 2: Revenge of the Black Panther includes Marvel Premiere #51–53, 456 pages, February 2019, 
 Marvel Masterworks The Avengers Vol. 19 includes Marvel Premiere #55, 328 pages, April 2019, 
 Dominic Fortune: It Can Happen Here and Now includes Marvel Premiere #56, 184 pages, February 2010, 
 Star-Lord: Guardian of the Galaxy includes Marvel Premiere #61, 424 pages, July 2014, 
 Guardians of the Galaxy: Solo Classic Omnibus includes Marvel Premiere #61, 1122 pages, November 2015,

Marvel Movie Premiere
The similarly-named Marvel Movie Premiere was a one-shot black-and-white magazine published by Marvel in September 1975. It featured an adaptation of The Land That Time Forgot by writer Marv Wolfman and artist Sonny Trinidad.

See also
 Marvel Premiere Classic — a line of hardcovers collecting "classic" pre–2000 storylines in the Marvel and related Universes.
 Marvel Spotlight

References

External links
 

1972 comics debuts
1981 comics endings
Comics anthologies
Comics by George Pérez
Comics by Marv Wolfman
Comics by Roy Thomas
Comics by Stan Lee
Comics by Steve Englehart
Defunct American comics
Marvel Comics titles